The Seychelles women's national volleyball team represents Seychelles in international competitions in women's volleyball. The squad's biggest win was the gold medal at the 2001 edition of the African Championship.

Results

African Championship
 1976-1999 — did not participate
 2001 —  Gold Medal
 2003 — 6th place
 2005-2011 — did not participate
 2013 — 7th place

All-Africa Games 
 2015 - 4th place

References 

Volleyball
National women's volleyball teams
Volleyball in Seychelles
Women's sport in Seychelles